Kansas City Mystics were a W-League women's soccer team that played their home games at the Blue Valley School District Athletic Complex in Overland Park, Kansas, United States. 

The team's coach, and general manager was Scoop Stanisic The team ceased operations in 2002 after posting an 11-2 regular season record. The roster included college, and international players some of whom went on to play for their country's national team, Women's United Soccer Association, and Canadian professional teams. Most notable is perhaps Maribel Dominguez from Mexico whose signing with a men's professional team led to a ruling by FIFA banning her participation in men's matches.

2002 Kansas City Mystics Roster
No. Name Pos. Age Nationality

1 Suzie Grech G 20 USA
2 Leah Sims D 21 USA
4 Pardis Brown D 21 USA
5 Lacey Woolf D 20 USA
6 Kamille Rosenfalck D 24 Denmark
7 Pamela Bedzrah F 23 England
8 Roseli M 31 Brazil
9 Maribel "Marigol" Dominguez F 23 Mexico
10 Iris Mora F 20 Mexico
11 Nildinja M 30 Brazil
14 Gillian Samuel D 23 Canada
15 Shannon DeVos M 20 USA
16 Amy Sullivant M 21 USA
17 Tennli Ulicny M 21 USA
18 Leigh Clark D 22 USA
19 Kallie Cox D 18 USA
21 Patrica Perez M 23 Mexico
22 Abby Crumpton F 21 USA
23 Brooke Jones M 21 USA
99 Jenny Willemse G 22 USA

External links
website

M
Soccer clubs in Missouri
Women's soccer clubs in the United States
Association football clubs disestablished in 2002
Defunct USL W-League (1995–2015) teams
2002 disestablishments in Kansas
Overland Park, Kansas
Women's sports in Kansas